Edith Nuong Faalong is a Ghanaian journalist, writer, gender activist and actor. She is currently a television host for the Spotlight, a current affairs programme on Mx24gh a media and television station in Ghana.

Early life and education 
Nuong hails from Lawra in the Upper West Region of Ghana, but was born in Tamale, Northern Region.  She had her secondary education at Aburi Girls Senior High School and later continued to the University of Ghana, Legon where she studied Economics and Geography.

Career

Advocacy 
Faalong is an advocate for affirmative action in Ghana's parliament and is keen on parity and inclusive development. She refers to herself as a feminist who advocates for women's rights in all aspects of life and endeavor.

Journalism 
Faalong joined Media General Ghana Limited in 2017 as a broadcaster for 3 FM and TV3. She is the first woman and the youngest journalist to host Hot Issues, a current affairs show on TV3.
 She worked in the TV3 newsroom and was also a member of the newspaper review team. Nuong is seen to be very informed and outspoken on social issues within her country.

Acting 
As an actor, she made headlines with her quick rise after only a short time in the Ghanaian film industry. She has been tipped as an actress to look out for especially after her role in Garrett Batty's Freetown which won her the Actress of the Year (Non-Nigerian) in the 2016 Nigeria Entertainment Awards (NEA).  She has featured in a number of TV series and movies such as 'Living with Trisha', 'A Northern Affair', 'Broadway', 'Sins Of Our Fathers' and 'Crime in Love', among others.

References 

Living people
Ghanaian film actresses
University of Ghana alumni
Alumni of Aburi Girls' Senior High School
Year of birth missing (living people)
Ghanaian women journalists
Ghanaian television presenters
Ghanaian women television presenters